John Lawson Lewis (March 26, 1800 – May 15, 1886) was the 17th mayor of New Orleans (April 10, 1854 – June 17, 1856). He had previously served in the Louisiana State Senate and as sheriff of Orleans Parish. During the American Civil War, in the sixth decade of his life, Lewis served in the Confederate Louisiana Militia as a general.

See also
Joshua Lewis (judge), his father
Thomas J. Lewis, his son
Michael Monroe Lewis, his 2nd great grandson

References

External links

Mayors of New Orleans
Louisiana sheriffs
Louisiana state senators
People of Louisiana in the American Civil War
Confederate militia generals
19th-century American politicians
1800 births
1886 deaths